Gangmae Station is a railway station on the Gyeongui-Jungang Line. It closed July 2009 due to its proximity to Haengsin Station but was reconstructed and reopened on October 25, 2014 following the development of the surrounding area.

External links
 Station information from Korail

Metro stations in Goyang
Seoul Metropolitan Subway stations
Railway stations opened in 2014
2014 establishments in South Korea